Vlk (feminine Vlková) is a Czechoslovak surname (meaning wolf). People with the surname Vlk include:
 František Vlk (born 1925), Czech footballer
 Jaromír Vlk (born 1949), Czech shot putter
 Lubomír Vlk (born 1964), Czech footballer
 Miloslav Vlk (1932–2017), Czech Archbishop and cardinal
 Petr Vlk, Czech ice hockey player
 Přemysl Vlk (1981/82–2003), Czech slalom canoer
 Vladimír Vlk (born 1968), Slovak ice hockey player

Czech-language surnames